Dawiat Mohamed (born 1979) is a Comorian politician.

Mohamed has been a member of the Assembly of the Union of the Comoros for Hambou since 2020.

References

Living people
1979 births
Comorian politicians
Members of the Assembly of the Union of the Comoros
21st-century Comorian women politicians
21st-century Comorian politicians